Superblock may refer to:

Urban planning
 Superblock (urban planning), a type of city block that is much larger than a traditional city block
 Superblock (University of Minnesota), a section of the Health area in the East Bank of the Minneapolis campus, US
 Superblock, a former large area formed after urban renewal in the cityscape of Huntington, West Virginia, US

Computing
 Superblock (file system), a segment of metadata describing the file system on a block device, as in the Unix File System
 Superblock, in the density matrix renormalization group numerical technique
 Superblock algorithm, in the pairwise summation numerical analysis
 Superblock, of pixels, for example in the AV1 video coding format, or VP9
 Superblocks, of memory in the Hoard C dynamic memory allocation

See also
 Superblock scheduling, a type of instruction scheduling